Honey Moon is the eighth studio album released by The Handsome Family. It was released 2009 by Carrot Top Records (North America) / Loose Music (Europe).

Reception
The album was well received by critics: according to Metacritic, the album has received an average review score of 75/100, based on 12 reviews, indicating "generally favorable reviews."

Track listing
 "Linger, Let Me Linger" – 3:34
 "Little Sparrows" – 3:08
 "My Friend" – 4:56
 "When You Whispered" – 3:11
 "The Loneliness of Magnets" – 3:43
 "June Bugs" – 3:38
 "A Thousand Diamond Rings" – 3:40
 "Love Is Like" – 3:21
 "The Petrified Forest" – 4:11
 "Wild Wood" - 3:10
 "Darling, My Darling" - 3:39
 "The Winding Corn Maze" - 4:35
 "The Red Leaf Forest" - 3:25
 Bonus track included on the digital version of the album sold through iTunes

Personnel
 Rennie Sparks - artwork; lyrics; vocals on "Wild Woods", "The Winding Corn Maze", "Little Sparrows", "The Petrified Forest" and "When You Whispered"
 Brett Sparks - music; all instruments except as follows
 Stephen Dorocke - lap steel on "Linger, Let Me Linger" and "Love Is Like"; guitar on "The Loneliness Of Magnets", "A Thousand Diamond Rings", "Wild Wood")
 Dave Gutierrez - classical guitar ("The Winding Corn Maze"), pedal steel ("Little Sparrows"), dobro ("When You Whispered")
 Jason Toth - drums
 Sheila Sachs - Layout assistance
 Mark Owen - photography

References

External links
The Handsome Family official website

2009 albums
The Handsome Family albums
Carrot Top Records albums
Loose Music albums